Mount Mahony is a massive mountain,  high, standing just east of the head of Victoria Upper Glacier, in Victoria Land, Antarctica. It was mapped by the Western Geological Party, led by Thomas Griffith Taylor, of the British Antarctic Expedition, 1910–13, and was named for Daniel James Mahony, a geologist of Melbourne, Australia.

References

Mountains of Victoria Land
Scott Coast